Ullu-Terkeme (Ullu-Tərəkəmə) is a rural locality (a selo) in Derbentsky District, Republic of Dagestan, Russia. The population was 1,599 as of 2010. There are 23 streets.

Geography 
Ullu-Terkeme is located 32 km northwest of Derbent (the district's administrative centre) by road. Tatlyar and Druzhba are the nearest rural localities.

Nationalities 
Azerbaijanis live there.

References 

Rural localities in Derbentsky District